Dewildemania is a genus of African flowering plants in the daisy family.

 Species

References

Flora of Africa
Vernonieae
Asteraceae genera